Cleland railway station is a railway station serving the village of Cleland, near Motherwell in North Lanarkshire, Scotland. Built on the Cleland and Midcalder Line it was originally named 'Omoa', after the nearby ironworks, until  on the Wishaw and Coltness Railway closed in 1930.

The station has two platforms, connected by a stairway footbridge, and CCTV. It is managed by ScotRail.

History
In 2019 the footbridge was replaced and lifts installed, allowing step-free access to both platforms.

Services 

On Sundays, there was normally no service prior to the December 2012 timetable change. However, in the four weeks leading up to Christmas an hourly service to Glasgow Central from Shotts via Whifflet is laid on for shoppers.

Cleland was not included in the timetable for the express passenger service along this line between Glasgow and Edinburgh.

However, from 9 December 2012 a new two-hourly Sunday service began operating between Glasgow Central and Edinburgh Waverley in both directions.

Traction 

Engineering works on other routes between Glasgow and Edinburgh may result in other diesel hauled passenger traction being seen, but these almost never call at this station.

Regular containerload and wagonload freight traffic also traverses the line regularly.

References

Notes

Sources

External links

Video footage of Cleland station

Railway stations in North Lanarkshire
SPT railway stations
Railway stations served by ScotRail
Railway stations in Great Britain opened in 1869
Former Caledonian Railway stations
1869 establishments in Scotland